Maple Energy is an integrated independent energy company with assets and operations in Peru.  Indigenous people from Peru's Amazon took over 9 of its oil wells in 2012.

References 

Oil and gas companies of Peru